Tolly Burkan, also known as Bruce Burkan, (born May 17, 1948 in New York City) is a firewalking spokesman.

During the 1970s, Burkan created a firewalking class and began teaching firewalking to the general public.  In the 1980s, he started working with large corporations and began training instructors.

He has written eight books that have been translated into 15 languages, including Extreme Spirituality, Let It Be Easy, and Dying to Live: From Despair and Death to Freedom and Joy.

Burkan's disappearance from Asbury Park, New Jersey and his subsequent reappearance two months later, after a memorial service, was the subject of national news in 1967.  Although he would explain in his book Dying to Live and in news stories years later  that he had run away from home for two months, the incident would continue to be cited in pseudoscience books as "still unexplained" and evidence of alien abduction  or teleportation

References

Further reading

Beth Ann Drier, "The Curious Hot Foot It to a New Fad," Los Angeles Times, 11 April 1984, pt. 1, 1. 

USA Today 4-2-90  Page 1, Section D

External links
 
 National Geographic
 Loring M. Danforth, Firewalking and Religious Healing: The Anastenaria of Greece and the American Firewalking Movement, Princeton University Press
 ABC Science article
 Discovery Channel
 Edwards, Emily D. “Firewalking: A Contemporary Ritual and Transformation.” TDR 42 (1998): 98-114.—analysis of Burkan's seminars
 Mythbusters - Firewalking 101
 "The Encyclopedia of Religious Phenomena"

1948 births
Living people
New Age writers
American motivational writers
American self-help writers
American spiritual teachers
American spiritual writers